The Men's 3000 metres steeplechase at the 2018 European Athletics Championships took place at the Olympic Stadium on 7 and 9 August.

Records

Schedule

Results

Round 1
First 5 in each heat (Q) and the next fastest 5 (q) advance to the Final.

Final

References

3000 metres steeplechase M
Steeplechase at the European Athletics Championships